Brownsburg Historic District is a national historic district located at Brownsburg, Rockbridge County, Virginia. The district encompasses 42 contributing buildings in the town of Brownsburg.  It includes a variety of residential, commercial, and institutional buildings most of which date from one of two periods - the first half of the 19th century and the period 1870–1910.  Notable buildings include the Swope House, Wade brick house, Bosworth log house, Newcomer house, Coblentz house and store, NYE Pool Hall, Wade frame house, Ward House, and the Fixx House.

It was listed on the National Register of Historic Places in 1973.

References

Historic districts in Rockbridge County, Virginia
Federal architecture in Virginia
National Register of Historic Places in Rockbridge County, Virginia
Historic districts on the National Register of Historic Places in Virginia